River Kings can refer to:

Sports
Cedar Rapids River Kings, a professional indoor American football team based in Cedar Rapids, Iowa, United States
Cornwall River Kings, a former professional ice hockey team based in Cornwall, Ontario, Canada
Mississippi RiverKings, a former professional minor league ice hockey team in Southaven, Mississippi, United States, formerly known as Memphis Riverkings  
River Kings, the male athletic teams of Clinton High School in Clinton, Iowa, United States

Culture
The River Kings, a novel by Max Fatchen, a South Australian children's writer and journalist.
The River Kings, a 1991 Australian mini series based on the novels The River Kings and Conquest of the River